Melchiorre Murenu (Macomer 1803 – 1854) was a blind Sardinian poet.
Melchiorre Murenu is known as the "Homer of Sardinia" because (just like the great Greek poet) he was blind and lived his entire life for poetry.

He was born in Macomer where he lived his entire life. At the age of three he became blind because of smallpox. Murenu's father was imprisoned when Melchiorre was ten years old, and is thought to have died during his imprisonment. This unfortunate circumstance drove Murenu's family in poverty (Murenu spoke of the difficult times of his childhood in the poem Supplica a Monsignore Bua). In these difficult circumstances Murenu could not afford to be formally educated, and he enjoyed spending time at the local church. There he acquainted himself to the biblical texts and, thanks to a prodigious memory, he could recite entire passages of the scriptures, as well as the daily sermons, entirely by heart.

Despite this background (or, perhaps, because of it), poverty and oppression are the main subjects of Murenu's poetry. Among his most famous lyrics are Supplica a Monsignore Bua ("Supplique to Mgr. Rua", about his family's misfortunes),  S'istadu de Sardigna  ("State of Sardinia", about the pervasive injustice against the defenseless people of Sardinia), and Tancas serradas a muru ("walled lands"), a quartile about the appropriation of lands.

Another famous composition by Murenu sealed his fate; it is Sas isporchizias de Bosa ("Bosa's filth"), a fictional (and decidedly unflattering) description of the city of Bosa. It is commonly thought that because of this poem, some of Bosa's inhabitants decided to avenge such offense by killing him. The night of 21 October 1854, three men, claiming to be there on behalf of a poet known to Murenu, lured him out of his place and pushed him over a cliff.

References

1803 births
1854 deaths
Sardinian-language poets
Italian poets
Italian male poets
Blind writers
19th-century poets
19th-century Italian male writers